Entrance music (also known as an entry theme or walk-on music) is a musical piece or song that is played for athletes or entertainers when they first appear in front of the spectators before beginning a performance. Popular music acts may have recorded intro and/or outro music played before and after a concert performance, which is often of a different genre from that of the act's own live music. Acts often retain a single signature tune throughout their career; music acts typically retain the same intro/outro at least for a whole concert tour.

Combat sports
 Ricky Hatton - Blue Moon by
 Wanderlei Silva - Darude - Sandstorm
 Anderson Silva - DMX - Ain't No Sunshine
 Roy Nelson - "Weird Al" Yankovic - Fat
 Brock Lesnar - Metallica - Enter Sandman

YouTuber and rapper KSI tends to use his own music as his entrance themes, most notably Down Like That, in which a live performance was held for KSI's walkout.

Professional snooker
As part of Barry Hearn's vision for the future of the professional game, walk-on music was introduced from the 2010 World Snooker Championship.  As of the 2012 World Snooker Championship, the last 32 players and their walk-on music was as follows:

Professional darts

Walk-on music for professional darts players is typically either related to their nickname or their nationality. Some examples are:

Roller derby
Walk-on music used in roller derby, also called skate-out music, has been a part of the sport since its very beginning.

Major League Baseball
The practice of using a heavy metal theme song to signal the entrance of a relief pitcher began at Qualcomm Stadium in 1998, when the San Diego Padres started playing "Hells Bells" by AC/DC to accompany Trevor Hoffman's taking the mound. San Jose Mercury News and ESPN.com wrote that the song should be honored by the National Baseball Hall of Fame and Museum. The use of rock and roll for entrance music emerged from the comedy film Major League (1989), in which relief pitcher Rick "Wild Thing" Vaughn entered the game to a cover of "Wild Thing" performed by X. In addition, batters will often select a song to play as they come to the plate in home games.

Wrestling

Wrestling companies often have an inhouse composer composing theme music for wrestlers. They also may use stock music.

Many wrestlers have used many themes over the course of their careers. Some wrestlers like Ric Flair and "Macho Man" Randy Savage are known for their one particular entrance theme song, Also Sprach Zarathustra and Pomp and Circumstance respectively.

See also
 Fight song
 Football chant
 Stadium anthem
 Theme music
 Music at sporting events
 Wedding music, music played during wedding the ceremony or at festivities before or after the event
 Prelude (music), a short piece of music which may serve as an introduction

References

Theme music
Sports music
Wrestling culture